Bloom's 2 sigma problem refers to an educational phenomenon and associated problem observed by educational psychologist Benjamin Bloom and initially reported in 1984 in the journal Educational Researcher. Bloom found that the average student tutored one-to-one using mastery learning techniques performed two standard deviations better than students educated in a classroom environment with one teacher to 30 students, with or without mastery learning. As quoted by Bloom: "the average tutored student was above 98% of the students in the control class". Additionally, the variation of the students' achievement changed: "about 90% of the tutored students ... attained the level of summative achievement reached by only the highest 20%" of the control class.

The phenomenon was described by Bloom as illustrative of the importance of the problem to "find methods of group instruction as effective as one-to-one tutoring". The phenomenon has also been used to illustrate that factors outside of a teachers' control influences student education outcomes, motivating research in alternative teaching methods, in some cases reporting larger standard deviation improvements than those predicted by the phenomenon. The phenomenon has also motivated developments in human-computer interaction for education in education, including cognitive tutors and learning management systems.

Mastery learning 

Mastery learning is an educational philosophy first proposed by Bloom in 1968 based on the premise that students must achieve a level of mastery (e.g., 90% on a knowledge test) in prerequisite knowledge before moving forward to learn subsequent information on a topic. Mastery is determined with regular tests, and students who do not yet achieve mastery on the test are given additional educational support before another test. This cycle continues until the learner accomplishes mastery, and they may then move on to the next stage. Failure for a student to achieve mastery is viewed, differently from conventional educational testing, as due to instruction rather than lack of student ability. Another key element of mastery learning is that it requires attention to individual students as opposed to assessing group performance. There is good evidence to suggest the effectiveness of mastery learning for improving student educational outcomes.

Two of the three groups in the original study by Bloom conducted mastery learning, with one control group that did not.

Correlations
Though Bloom concluded that one-to-one tutoring is "too costly for most societies to bear on a large scale", Bloom conjectured that a combination of two or three altered variables may result in a similar performance improvement. Bloom thus challenged researchers and teachers to "find methods of group instruction as effective as one-to-one tutoring". Bloom's graduate students Joanne Anania and Arthur J. Burke conducted studies of the effect at different grade levels and in different schools, observing students with "great differences in cognitive achievement, attitudes, and academic self-concept".

Bloom classified alterable variables that may have, in combination, a 2 sigma effect as the following "objects of change process": 
 Learner
 Instructional material
 Home environment or peer group
 Teacher

Bloom and his graduate students considered and tested various combinations of these variables, focusing only on those variables that individually had a 0.5 or higher effect size. These included:

References

Further reading

External links
 Bloom's 2 Sigma and Vockell's -2 Sigma
 The 2 Sigma Problem: The Search for Methods of Group Instruction as Effective as One-to-One Tutoring (original paper)

Educational psychology
1984 introductions